

Events

February events 
 February 24 – Grand Trunk Railway acquires the Northern and Northwestern Railway.
 February 29 – Opening of Listowel and Ballybunion monorail in Ireland.

May events 
 May – The Great Indian Peninsula Railway completes its Victoria Terminus station building in Bombay's Bori Bunder district.

April events 
 April 1 – The Old Colony Railroad leases the Boston and Providence Railroad for a period of 99 years.

June events 
 June 11 – The Canadian Pacific acquires control of the Soo Line, renaming it to the Minneapolis, St. Paul and Sault Ste. Marie Railroad.
 June 15 – The first train to Casper, Wyoming, operating on the Chicago and North Western Railway, arrives.

July events 
 July–August – First "Race to the North": Operators of the West and East Coast Main Lines in Britain accelerate their services between London and Edinburgh.

August events 
 August 7 – Sir William Cornelius Van Horne succeeds George Stephen as president of the Canadian Pacific Railway.
 August 12 – Atchison, Topeka and Santa Fe Railway subsidiary companies complete construction of the final link in what has come to be known as the Surf Line connecting Los Angeles and San Diego.

September events 
 September 10 – The Chicago, Milwaukee and St. Paul Railway (later to become known as the Milwaukee Road) operates the first passenger train with electric lights (rather than gas lights) in the United States west of Chicago, Illinois, on a train between Chicago and the Twin Cities.
 September 18 – The first revenue train on the Canada Atlantic Railway's Chaudière Extension departs for Chaudière Falls, Ontario (near Ottawa).

November events
 November 10 – Opening of Saint-Chély–Neussargues line in France over Garabit viaduct.

December events
 December 29 – First train crosses Poughkeepsie Bridge, New York.

Unknown date events
 Spring – The Atchison, Topeka and Santa Fe Railway begins through service between Kansas City, Kansas, and Chicago, Illinois, over the railroad's newly completed line.
 First section of metre gauge Brünig railway line in Switzerland opened by Jura–Bern–Lucerne Railway from Brienz over the Brünig Pass to Alpnachstad using the Riggenbach rack system.
 First articulated Mallet locomotive completed, by Tubize of Belgium.

Accidents

Births

Deaths

April deaths
 April 19 – Thomas Russell Crampton, English steam locomotive designer who produced the Crampton locomotive type as well as a tunnel boring machine for the Channel Tunnel (b. 1816).

June deaths
 June 14 – Charles Crocker, a member of The Big Four group of financiers in California (b. 1822).

References